Unión Deportiva Somozas is a football team based in As Somozas in the autonomous community of Galicia. Founded in 1984, the team plays in Tercera División RFEF – Group 1. The club's home ground is Pardiñas, which has a capacity of 1,500 spectators.

History
Founded in 1984, Somozas started to play as a senior in the following year, achieving promotion after finishing fourth in the Segunda Regional. In 1993, the club achieved promotion to Tercera División.

In 1999, after suffering relegation from the fourth division, Somozas chose not to play in the Regional Preferente and nor in the Primera Regional, returning to the seventh division. The club only returned to the fourth tier in 2008, and reached the Segunda División B for the first time six years later.

Season to season

3 seasons in Segunda División B
16 seasons in Tercera División
1 season in Tercera División RFEF

Current squad

Honours
Tercera División
Winners: 2013–14

References

External links
UD Somozas Official Web 
Futbolme team Profile 
Club & stadium history 

Football clubs in Galicia (Spain)
Association football clubs established in 1984
1984 establishments in Spain